The 1981 Minnesota Golden Gophers football team represented the University of Minnesota in the 1981 Big Ten Conference football season. In their third year under head coach Joe Salem, the Golden Gophers compiled a 6–5 record and outscored their opponents by a combined total of 274 to 264. It was the final season in Memorial Stadium.
 
Quarterback Mike Hohensee received the team's Most Valuable Player award, while flanker Chester Cooper was named offensive MVP, and linebacker Jim Fahnhorst was named the defensive MVP. Fahnhorst and offensive tackle Ken Dallafior were named All-Big Ten first team. Cooper, offensive lineman Bill Humphries, defensive end Karl Mecklenburg, and defensive lineman Fred Orgas were named All-Big Ten second team.  Defensive lineman Brent Harms and Fred Orgas, free safety Mike Robb, and safety Rick Witthus were named Academic All-Big Ten.

Several Minnesota players ranked among the Big Ten leaders, including the following:
 Mike Hohensee led the conference with 20 passing touchdowns and ranked fourth with 2,412 passing yards. 
 Wide receiver Chester Cooper led the conference with 1,012 receiving yards and ranked second with 58 receptions.
 Running back Frank Jacobs ranked sixth in the conference with 638 rushing yards and fifth with eight rushing touchdowns.
 Placekicker Jim Gallery ranked second in the conference with 13 field goals made, fourth with a 59.8 field goal percentage, and seventh with 62 points scored.

Total attendance for the season was 301,248, which averaged to 43,035. The season high for attendance was against Michigan.

Schedule

Personnel

Game summaries

Oregon State

Ohio State

Wisconsin

The loss overshadowed a record-setting day for Mike Hohensee and Chester Cooper. Hohensee set the single season school records for completions and passing yardage while Chester Cooper broke the single season school record for receiving yardage.

References

Minnesota
Minnesota Golden Gophers football seasons
Minnesota Golden Gophers football